Historic St. Francis Xavier Church is a Black Catholic parish in Baltimore, Maryland. It's said to be the first exclusively Black parish in America, having been established in 1863 (with roots in the late 18th century).

History

Background 
On July 11, 1791, six ships from the French fleet arrived at Fell's Point, Baltimore, bringing a large number of Black Catholic refugees from Cape Francois in the French colony of San Domingo. There were between 500 and 1,000 Black refugees, both enslaved and free. The Sulpician Fathers had fled France in 1790 as refugees of the French Revolution and were affiliated with St. Mary's Seminary, in whose basements the Haitians began to meet. Both the Sulpicians and the Haitian refugees spoke French. 

The majority of the free Black refugees were educated and wealthy, and the church became popular with the elite class of African-Americans in Baltimore thereafter.

In 1828, one of the parish priests, Fr James Joubert, teamed with Servant of God Mother Lange to found the Oblate Sisters of Providence, the first all-Black order of Catholic nuns, and started the all-girls' St Frances Academy, the first and oldest Black Catholic school in the United States. When the Oblates moved to a new location in 1836, the parish moved with them.

First move 
In the 1850s, local Jesuits invited the congregation to begin meeting at St. Ignatius Church, where the group again met in a basement chapel, this time under the name of Blessed Peter Claver.  

Present at this time were Fr Peter Louis Miller, SJ and the retired Bishop Michael O'Connor, both of whom would later work with the country's first Black (though by then former) seminarian William Augustine Williams to minister to the Black community at St Ignatius/Peter Claver.

Independent parish 
In 1863, the Jesuits helped the congregation purchase a building, which was dedicated the next year under the current name.

In 1871, the Mill Hill Fathers arrived from England at the request of the local bishop, to minister to African-Americans. They were given charge of the parish that same year. Within the few decades, the Mill Hill operations in the US were spun off into a new religious society, the Society of St Joseph of the Sacred Heart (aka the Josephites). They administer the parish to this day.

The parish would move to a new location in 1932, and again in 1968 to its present location at the intersection of Caroline and Oliver streets. The (now-coeducational) Oblates school and convent are still located within walking distance.

Inculturation 
During the Black Catholic Movement of the late 60s to 1990s, the parish would become the first to allow and practice shouting, a distinct form of Black Christian liturgical dance (which Black Catholics adopted from Black Protestantism).

See also
Josephite Fathers
Society of Saint-Sulpice

References

External links
 Official website
 A Short History of Historic St. Francis Xavier Church
 "First Negro Parish in the U.S." (The New York Age, 27 January 1934)
Roman Catholic Archdiocese of Baltimore

1863 establishments in Maryland
African-American history in Baltimore
African-American Roman Catholicism
Afro-Caribbean culture in the United States
Afro-Haitian culture
Roman Catholic churches completed in 1863
French-American culture in Baltimore
Haitian-American culture in Maryland
Haitian-American history
Oliver, Baltimore
Religious organizations established in 1863
Roman Catholic churches in Baltimore
Roman Catholic Ecclesiastical Province of Baltimore
Society of the Priests of Saint Sulpice
19th-century Roman Catholic church buildings in the United States
Josephite churches in the United States
African-American Roman Catholic churches